is a retired Japanese professional wrestler who worked for All Japan Pro Wrestling and Pro Wrestling Noah.

Professional wrestling career

All Japan Pro Wrestling (1991–2000)
Asako made his debut in a tag team match with Richard Slinger, losing to Masao Inoue and Mitsuo Momota. Since his debut he spent most of his time in the opening matches and as an enhancement talent although he rarely wins matches, as he got a little better Asako won his first and only achievement by winning the January 3 Korakuen Hall Junior Heavyweight Battle Royal on January 3, 1994. Asako continued to show progression in his wrestling skills putting on a classic 6-man tag team match with partners Mitsuharu Misawa and Kenta Kobashi defeating Akira Taue, Tamon Honda and Toshiaki Kawada. In 1998 he entered in the AJPW World Junior Heavyweight Title League and made it to the finals but was unable to win as he lost to Yoshinari Ogawa. He remained in All Japan until June 2000, when he followed Misawa and 24 other wrestlers to form Pro Wrestling Noah.

Pro Wrestling Noah (2000–2002)
In 2000 Asako wrestled his first match for Noah in a 6-man tag team match with Takao Omori & Yoshihiro Takayama but was defeated by Daisuke Ikeda, Masahito Kakihara & Yoshinari Ogawa. As a singles wrestler Asako improved his wrestling ability in a last few years of his career and even showing great progress in his singles matches including the Junior Heavyweight Division. In 2001 he was qualify for the GHC Junior Heavyweight Title Tournament, as he defeated Matt Murphy on the first night but lost Juventud Guerrera. On July 26, 2002, Asako announce his retirement as he wrestled his last match in a 6-man tag team match with his partners Kobashi and Misawa picking up the victory by defeating Akira Taue, Makoto Hashi and Masao Inoue.

Personal life
After his retirement, Asako became a trainer and road agent for Pro Wrestling Noah, as well as a judoka instructor.

Championships and accomplishments 
All Japan Pro Wrestling
January 3 Korakuen Hall Junior Heavyweight Battle Royal (1994)

Notes

External links 
Satoru Asako at Wrestling Data

Japanese male professional wrestlers
Living people
1971 births